The ZEC de la Croche is a "zone d'exploitation controlée" (controlled harvesting zone) (ZEC) in La Tuque (urban agglomeration), in administrative region of Mauricie, in Québec, in Canada. The zec is managed by the "Sacerf La Croche Association".

Origin of name 

Zec Croche takes its name from the Croche River (La Tuque), which serves also as the Eastern limit of the Zec. The toponym Zec de la Croche was officialized on December 18, 1986, at the bank of place names of Commission de toponymie du Quebec.

Geography 

Zec is located between the Croche River (La Tuque) on the East; and the rivers Saint-Maurice and Trenche to the West. The Zec includes 97 lakes and all of these flows to the Saint-Maurice River.

In terms of geology, the ZEC is part of Laurentian mountains. The altitude of the territory varies between 156 and 447 m.

See also 

 Croche River (La Tuque)
 La Tuque (urban agglomeration)
 Saint-Maurice River
 Zone d'exploitation contrôlée (Controlled Harvesting Zone) (ZEC)

References

External links 
 Tourisme Mauricie - Regional touristic Association of Mauricie
 Ville de La Tuque - Officiel website

Protected areas of Mauricie
Geography of La Tuque, Quebec
Protected areas established in 1978